Vietnam Veterans Memorial is a national memorial established in honor of Vietnam War veterans, near United States Highway 64 in Angel Fire, New Mexico. Until 2017, it was a New Mexico state park, and it is now under the Department of Veteran Services.

As the "Disabled American Veterans Vietnam Veterans National Memorial" it was recognized by the United States Congress as a "memorial of national significance" in 1987.

The Chapel was dedicated May 22, 1971.

Gallery

See also
 List of national memorials of the United States

References

External links

The David Westphall Veterans Foundation
Angel Fire Vietnam Veterans Memorial
Virtual Tour of Park

1971 establishments in New Mexico
Buildings and structures completed in 1971
Military and war museums in New Mexico
Monuments and memorials in New Mexico
Museums established in 1971
Museums in Colfax County, New Mexico
Parks in Colfax County, New Mexico
Protected areas established in 2005
State parks of New Mexico
Vietnam War monuments and memorials in the United States
Vietnam War museums
National Memorials of the United States